Asemesthes is a genus of African ground spiders that was first described by Eugène Simon in 1887.

Species
 it contains twenty-six species, all from South Africa, Namibia, Ethiopia, or Angola:
Asemesthes affinis Lessert, 1933 – Angola
Asemesthes albovittatus Purcell, 1908 – Namibia, South Africa
Asemesthes ales Tucker, 1923 – South Africa
Asemesthes alternatus Lawrence, 1928 – Namibia
Asemesthes ceresicola Tucker, 1923 – South Africa
Asemesthes decoratus Purcell, 1908 – Namibia, South Africa
Asemesthes flavipes Purcell, 1908 – Namibia
Asemesthes fodina Tucker, 1923 – South Africa
Asemesthes hertigi Lessert, 1933 – Angola
Asemesthes kunenensis Lawrence, 1927 – Namibia
Asemesthes lamberti Tucker, 1923 – South Africa
Asemesthes lineatus Purcell, 1908 – Namibia, South Africa
Asemesthes modestus Dalmas, 1921 – South Africa
Asemesthes montanus Tucker, 1923 – South Africa
Asemesthes nigristernus Dalmas, 1921 – South Africa
Asemesthes numisma Tucker, 1923 – South Africa
Asemesthes oconnori Tucker, 1923 – South Africa
Asemesthes pallidus Purcell, 1908 – South Africa
Asemesthes paynteri Tucker, 1923 – South Africa
Asemesthes perdignus Dalmas, 1921 – Namibia
Asemesthes purcelli Tucker, 1923 – South Africa
Asemesthes reflexus Tucker, 1923 – South Africa
Asemesthes septentrionalis Caporiacco, 1940 – Ethiopia
Asemesthes sinister Lawrence, 1927 – Namibia
Asemesthes subnubilus Simon, 1887 (type) – South Africa
Asemesthes windhukensis Tucker, 1923 – Namibia

References

Araneomorphae genera
Gnaphosidae
Spiders of Africa
Taxa named by Eugène Simon